Subbulakshmi Jegadeesan (born 24 June 1947) is an Indian politician. She was The Deputy general-secretary of the Dravida Munnetra Kazhagam  and the Union Minister of State in the Ministry of Social Justice and Empowerment.

Career
She was a member of the 14th Lok Sabha of India, representing the Tiruchengode constituency of Tamil Nadu as a member of the Dravida Munnetra Kazhagam (DMK) political party. She was previously elected to the Modakurichi constituency of the Tamil Nadu Legislative Assembly in 1977, 1996 elected to the Erode constituency of the Tamil Nadu Legislative Assembly in 1989.

She was minister in the ministry of Textile, kaadhi, handloom, small scale industries, Prohibition & excise of Tamil Nadu, 1977–1980.

She was minister in the ministry of Social welfare of Tamil Nadu, 1989–1991.

She was Minister of State in the Ministry of Social Justice and Empowerment of the Government of India.

She was the Deputy General Secretary, serving in the High level committee of the Dravida Munnetra Kazhagam

Retirement
In a 29 August 2022 letter to M. K. Stalin, Subbulakshmi Jagadeesan tendered her resignation from all posts and the Dravida Munnetra Kazhagam party as she wishes to "retire from Politics."

References

External links
Official biographical sketch in Parliament of India website

Living people
1947 births
India MPs 2004–2009
Union ministers of state of India
Dravida Munnetra Kazhagam politicians
Union Ministers from Tamil Nadu
Lok Sabha members from Tamil Nadu
21st-century Indian women politicians
21st-century Indian politicians
Women union ministers of state of India
Tamil Nadu MLAs 1996–2001
People from Namakkal district
20th-century Indian women
20th-century Indian people
Women members of the Tamil Nadu Legislative Assembly